Esther Seligson (25 October 1941 – 8 February 2010) was a Mexican writer, poet, translator, and historian. She was an academic, with a wide range of interests including art, cultural history, Jewish philosophy, mythology, religion and theater. She published books, poems, short stories and translations. She won the Xavier Villaurrutia Prize and the Magda Donato Award for her literary contributions.

Biography 
Esther Seligson was born 25 October 1941 in Mexico City, Mexico, to a family of Orthodox Jews.  She wanted to be a dancer, but her parents were strongly opposed, so she began studying chemistry at the National Autonomous University of Mexico before changing her academic direction.

She continued her studies at La Sorbonne and the University of Bordeaux, focusing on history, the Middle Ages, and philosophy.

In her 1984 book,  she looks at the body, the heart, lungs, stomach, as a lover, in a sensual discovery of their sensations. She published many other works, mostly not for commercial audiences. Her last book,  was finished three weeks before her death and was published posthumously.

She also served as a guest lecturer at Centro de Arte Dramático A.C. (CADACP),  (INBA),  (INAH),  (UAM), as well as many other institutions. She possessed a wide range of expertise and taught courses on art of the Middle Ages, comparative religion, cultural history, ideological history, Jewish philosophy, mythology, theater history, theatrical production and stagecraft.

Throughout her career, Seligson collaborated in many newspapers and magazines in Mexico. She translated the work of Romanian philosopher Emile Michel Cioran; Egyptian Jewish poet, Edmond Jabès; Emmanuel Levinas; Virginia Woolf; and Marguerite Yourcenar, as well as others. She was made a fellow of the Mexican Center of Writers in 1969, served as project coordinator of the Directorate General of Popular Culture from 1977 to 1979 and was on the editorial board of the magazine Escénica, published by UNAM.

She enjoyed traveling, believing that "It's good to be wandering pilgrim. Feeling alien in every city where you live gives you more emotional contact." She journeyed to southern India, Paris, Prague, Tibet, and Toledo, Spain.  For a brief period, Seligson settled in Lisbon and later took up residence in Jerusalem.

Seligson died 8 February 2010 in Mexico City, Mexico and was buried in the Panteón Israelita.

Selected works 

Essays 
, Plaza y Valdés, 1988.
El teatro, festín efímero, UAM, Cultura Universitaria, 1989.
Escritura y el enigma de la otredad, Ediciones Sin Nombre, 2000.
Apuntes sobre Cioran, FONCA/CONACULTA, La Centena, 2003.
A campo traviesa, FCE, Letras Mexicanas, 2005.

Novels and short stories 
 (1969)
Otros son los sueños (1973)
La morada del tiempo (1981)
Diálogos con el cuerpo (1981)
Las figuraciones como método de escritura (1981)
Sed de mar (1986)
Luz de dos (1989)
La fugacidad como método de escritura (1989)
Los siete pecados capitales (colectivo) (1989)
El teatro, festín efímero (1990)
Indicios y quimeras, isomorfismos (1991)
A campo traviesa (2005)
Toda la luz (2006)
Todo aquí es polvo (2010, released posthumously)

Poems 
 (1977)
De sueños, presagios y otras voces (1978)
Rescoldos (2000)
Simiente (2003)
Alba marina (2005)
Oración del retorno (tikun) (2006)
A los pies de un Buda sonriente (2007)
Negro es su rostro (2010)

References 

1941 births
2010 deaths
Mexican Jews
Mexican women poets
Mexican feminist writers
Writers from Mexico City
Jewish feminists
Jewish poets
Jewish women writers
National Autonomous University of Mexico alumni
University of Paris alumni
University of Bordeaux alumni
20th-century Mexican poets
20th-century Mexican women writers